Mary Kapuahualani "Girlie" Robinson (born Mary Kapuahualani Hart in 1896–97, died June 5, 1978) was a Republican Senator from Oahu in the Hawaii Territorial Legislature. She was one of two women in the Territorial Senate in 1951, with the other being Thelma Akana Harrison. Before being elected to the legislature, she was president of We The Women of Hawaii, and worked within the Territorial Government for 21 years.

In February 1945, she married local businessman Mark Alexander Robinson. In 1951, she founded Robinson Travel Inc., which had become a multimillion-dollar company by the time of her death in 1978.

See also
Mark P. Robinson Family

Bibliography

References 

1978 deaths
20th-century American politicians
20th-century American women politicians
Hawaii Republicans
Members of the Hawaii Territorial Legislature
People from Oahu
Women territorial legislators in Hawaii
1890s births